Ray Bradbury Collected Short Stories is a collection of three short stories by Ray Bradbury.  It was published in 2001 as part of Peterson Publishing's The Great Author Series.  The stories originally appeared in the magazines The Saturday Evening Post and New Story.

Contents
 "The Other Foot"
 "The April Witch"
 "The Veldt"

References
 
 

2001 short story collections
Short story collections by Ray Bradbury